The Question Jar Show is a two-disk live album by singer Mike Doughty. It includes live acoustic recordings performed by himself with his partner Andrew "Scrap" Livingston. In between some songs, the duo answer questions that audience members wrote and placed in a jar at the front of the stage before the shows started.

Track listing

References 

2012 albums
Mike Doughty albums
ATO Records albums